National Weather Service Nashville is a weather forecast office responsible for monitoring weather conditions for 38 counties in Middle Tennessee. The office is in charge of weather forecasts, warnings, and local statements as well as aviation weather. It is equipped with a WSR-88D (NEXRAD) radar and an Automated Surface Observing System (ASOS) that greatly increases the ability to forecast. While it is officially the Nashville forecast office, the WFO is technically located in Wilson County near Old Hickory, Tennessee, along the shoreline of Old Hickory Lake near the Davidson/Wilson County line. 

The Weather Service Office of Nashville was awarded the United States Department of Commerce Bronze Medal Award for superior federal service three times, in December 1998, May 2007, and April 2010. All three instances were for providing life-saving services for the three major tornado outbreaks that occurred in Middle Tennessee in April 1998, April 2006, and February 2008, respectively.

NOAA Weather Radio
The National Weather Service Forecast Office in Old Hickory, Tennessee provides programming for 12 NOAA Weather Radio stations.

Weather radio stations

References

External links
Nashville Office Main Page 
NOAA Weather Radio Coverage Maps 

 

Buildings and structures in Nashville, Tennessee 
Nashville, Tennessee 
National Weather Service Forecast Offices